The following lists events that happened during 1870 in the Austro-Hungarian Empire.

Events

January
 January 6 – The Musikverein, Vienna, is inaugurated in Austria-Hungary

References 

 
Years of the 19th century in Austria-Hungary
1870s in Austria-Hungary